Pineland is a city in Sabine County, Texas, United States. The population was 888 at the 2020 census.

Geography

Pineland is located at  (31.248094, –93.974688).

Climate

The climate in this area is characterized by hot, humid summers and generally mild to cool winters.  According to the Köppen Climate Classification system, Pineland has a humid subtropical climate, abbreviated "Cfa" on climate maps.

Historical development
The site was first established in 1902 as the Gulf, Beaumont and Great Northern Railway was built through the county, as this was a lumber camp. In 1904, a post office was opened and three years later, a sawmill would begin operation under the Garrison Norton Lumber Company. After running there for 3 years, Thomas L. L. Temple (who was part owner of the mill) bought out the interest of the other owners, and established the Temple Lumber Company. The residents of the town voted in 1941 to become incorporated.

Demographics

As of the 2020 United States census, there were 888 people, 451 households, and 264 families residing in the city.

As of the census of 2000, there were 980 people, 371 households, and 260 families residing in the city. The population density was 497.5 people per square mile (192.1/km). There were 447 housing units at an average density of 226.9 per square mile (87.6/km). The racial makeup of the city was 69.90% White, 25.61% African American, 0.82% Native American, 0.20% Asian, 1.43% from other races, and 2.04% from two or more races. Hispanic or Latino of any race were 3.47% of the population.

There were 371 households, out of which 32.6% had children under the age of 18 living with them, 46.1% were married couples living together, 20.8% had a female householder with no husband present, and 29.9% were non-families. 27.5% of all households were made up of individuals, and 14.0% had someone living alone who was 65 years of age or older. The average household size was 2.49 and the average family size was 3.04.

In the city, the population was spread out, with 26.4% under the age of 18, 7.0% from 18 to 24, 28.1% from 25 to 44, 19.1% from 45 to 64, and 19.4% who were 65 years of age or older. The median age was 36 years. For every 100 females, there were 94.1 males. For every 100 females age 18 and over, there were 82.1 males.

The median income for a household in the city was $27,563, and the median income for a family was $33,250. Males had a median income of $30,300 versus $22,159 for females. The per capita income for the city was $18,043. About 16.7% of families and 19.5% of the population were below the poverty line, including 27.9% of those under age 18 and 12.0% of those age 65 or over.

Education
The City of Pineland is served by the West Sabine Independent School District and home to the West Sabine High School Tigers.

References

External links
 

Cities in Sabine County, Texas
Cities in Texas
Logging communities in the United States